"You Can Get It If You Really Want" is a famous rocksteady song written and performed by Jamaican reggae singer songwriter Jimmy Cliff and released as a single in July 1970. A version was recorded by Jamaican singer Desmond Dekker and released within a few weeks of Cliff's version. It became a hit in its own right as a single released in a number of markets, reaching number 2 on the UK Singles Chart.

Charts

Weekly charts

Year-end charts

Covers
The UK's Jamaican origin reggae band The Cimarons released it as a single in 1974.

The song has been covered by a great number of artists including by Italian pop singer Sabrina (Sabrina Salerno) in her 1991 album Over the Pop and by Stiff Little Fingers on their 1999 album Hope Street where the song is retitled "You Can Get It (If Yu Really Want It)".

French singer Johnny Hallyday sang it in French under the title T'as le bonjour de l'amour released on his album Hollywood in 1979.

The American Ska band, The Siren Six,  covered the song on their album "Young and Professional" in 1998.

In popular culture
The Jimmy Cliff song was famously used in the 1972 film The Harder They Come.

In 1990, the song was used on the album Sebastian from The Little Mermaid as most of the songs were performed by Samuel E. Wright as Sebastian the crab. Wright also performed this version in Sebastian's Caribbean Jambore.

The Jimmy Cliff version was used in the soundtrack of the 1997 film Speed 2: Cruise Control; the 2005 Will Smith film Hitch and the 2012 Aardman Animation film The Pirates! In an Adventure with Scientists!.

Cliff’s version was used as a musical number in the inaugural episode of the British television musical comedy drama serial Blackpool, whereas Dekker's version was also used in the soundtrack of the 2010 British film Made in Dagenham.

The Jimmy Cliff version was featured in the Marvel Studios I Am Groot short "Magnum Opus".

Appearances
Jimmy Cliff included his own version of the song on his 2004 compilation album Reggae Night. The Dekker version on the other hand was included in the triple-disc compilation album released Now That's What I Call Reggae in June 2012.

References

1970 songs
1970 singles
Jimmy Cliff songs
Desmond Dekker songs
Trojan Records singles